The Taiping Mountain Forest Railway, also known as Bongbong Train is a 36.4 km (22.6 miles) long narrow-gauge forest railway with a gauge of  in Yilan County, Taiwan. Part of it can be used for heritage trains, but it is temporarily closed.

History
The Taiping Mountain Forest Railway was commissioned in 1920 and connected to the Luodong Forest Railway in 1924. No regular passenger services have been provided since 1979, but a short section of the track was used for a sightseeing train.  Since commercial forestry has been phased out on Taiping Mountain, the area is used for sightseeing and recreation.

In 2012, due to damage caused by a typhoon, the sightseeing train was taken out of use. On 19 September 2018, the operation was officially resumed on a 3 km-long section of the track. Eight trips per day are available between Tài Píng Shān-sho station and Shigeru station at intervals of 30 minutes. Each one-way trip takes 20 minutes.

Maosing Reminiscent Trail
The 1.5 km (nearly 1 mile)-long Maosing Reminiscent Trail (closed) starts at the platform of Maosing Railway Station. It runs at a height of 1.870 m to 1.950 m above sea level on the disused railway track and has thus only a relatively small gradient. There are recreation and information boards about history, natural resources, and geology.

The Maosing Reminiscent Trail provides a combination of both heritage and ecotourism. Most of the railway sleepers are rotten, but a majority of the rails are still in good order; the rails are left in place and railway sleepers are covered in gravel to provide a footpath. Most of the trestle bridges have collapsed or deteriorated. Thus, some of them have been repaired, some of them left as historic ruins, and others have had to be removed and replaced by modern suspension bridges.

Jancing Historic Trail
The Jancing Historic Trail was installed on a section of the former Jancing Forest Railway and originally had a total length of 2.35 km (1.4 miles). Since a landslide occurred, only 0.9 km (0.5 miles) are publicly accessible. The former Jancing Forest Railway was approximately 5.5 km (3.4 miles) long and provides access to the natural and cultural heritage along the old railway track. The remaining rails, trolleys, and bogies are a reminder of long-gone times of the lumber industry.

Gallery

Track

Old Taiping Mountain Railway
The Old Taiping Mountain Railway has been removed and only very little information about it is available.

New Taiping Mountain Railway
The New Taiping Mountain Railway is the main system that exists today. It uses a combination of railways and aerial tramways to transport lumber down the mountainous terrain.

Stations

Lines

Dayuan Mountain Railway
Dayuan Mountain

References

Mountain railways in Taiwan
2 ft 6 in gauge railways in Taiwan
Forest railways in Taiwan
Railway lines opened in 1924
Tourist attractions in Yilan County, Taiwan
1924 establishments in Taiwan